Tausug or Tausūg may refer to:
 Tausug language, Malayo-Polynesian language spoken mainly in the Philippines
 Tausug alphabet
 Tausūg people, speakers of the language

Language and nationality disambiguation pages